Heiko Schwartz (September 21, 1911 – October 29, 1973) was a German water polo player and freestyle swimmer who competed in the 1932 Summer Olympics and in the 1936 Summer Olympics.

He was born in Norden.

In 1932, he was part of the German team which won the silver medal. He played all four matches and scored four goals.

Four years later, he was eliminated in the first round of the 100 metre freestyle competition.

See also
 List of Olympic medalists in water polo (men)

External links
 

1911 births
1973 deaths
People from Norden, Lower Saxony
Sportspeople from Lower Saxony
German male water polo players
German male swimmers
Olympic water polo players of Germany
Olympic swimmers of Germany
People from the Province of Hanover
Water polo players at the 1932 Summer Olympics
Swimmers at the 1936 Summer Olympics
Olympic silver medalists for Germany
Olympic medalists in water polo
European Aquatics Championships medalists in swimming
Medalists at the 1932 Summer Olympics
20th-century German people